MHz Networks is an American public broadcaster that specializes in international television programming.

Washington, D.C., broadcast operations

MHz (pronounced "M-H-Z") Networks began as a project of the Commonwealth Public Broadcasting Corporation. The broadcaster's original stations were WNVT in Goldvein, Virginia, and WNVC in Fairfax, Virginia, which served the Washington, D.C., television market. International programming began on WNVC in 1996, branded "World View TV". In 2001, the two stations became known as MHz Networks, with WNVC becoming MHz1 and WNVT becoming MHz2.

In the digital television era, WNVC and WNVT placed a set of twelve international news channels on their two signals. The final set of channels consisted of TRT World, CGTN America, CGTN Documentary, Africa Today TV, France 24, CNC World, Arirang, TeleSUR, Deutsche Welle, and Vietnet. Previous channels included NHK World, BVN, Al Jazeera English, Blue Ocean Network, SABC News International, NTA, Ethiopian Television, RT America, RT Spanish, VTV4, Euronews, CNC World, and TRT Türk. Two months before the end of broadcast operations in Washington, on February 1, 2018, RT America was dropped from WNVC's signal, apparently due to concerns that MHz Networks or CPBC would be required to register under the Foreign Agents Registration Act.

In 2013, Commonwealth Public Broadcasting Corporation spun off the MHz Networks unit and sold the WNVC and WNVT towers. On April 1, 2018, MHz Networks exited the Washington, D.C. market after CPBC sold the stations' channel allocations in the Federal Communications Commission's ongoing spectrum reallocation auction.

In November 2022, MHz Networks was acquired by Kino Lorber.

MHz Worldview

MHz Worldview was an independent, American, non-commercial public television network that broadcast newscasts and other programs from around the world. It was owned and operated by MHz Networks.

MHz Worldview offered international newscasts, foreign dramas, music performances, and diversity programming, in English or with subtitles.

The channel was available as a subchannel on several U.S. public TV stations.

On January 8, 2020, MHz Networks announced the closure of MHz Worldview as they transition to digital streaming services. The network shut down at Midnight Eastern Time on March 1, 2020. Near the closure, the many television stations that had programming from MHz switched to different networks. Five stations switched to World Channel, another five to First Nations Experience and another five to DW. MHz Worldview was the main affiliate for WPPT and they switched to PBS. WCFE-TV switched to NHK World-Japan. KMOS-TV started its new independent channel in subchannel 6.3, named KMOS Emerge. KUEN now carries local programming on subchannel 9.2, previously used by MHz Worldview. KWSU-TV removed subchannel 10.3 after MHz Worldview was closed.

Former affiliates

MHz Choice

On October 20, 2015, MHz Networks launched an OTT streaming video on demand SVOD service called MHz Choice (pronounced "M-H-Z Choice") in the U.S. The service expanded into Canada in September 2017.

MHz Choice features mysteries, dramas and comedies from MHz Networks' catalog of international programs, unedited with English subtitles. The direct to consumer service is available on the web at mhzchoice.com and on a variety of apps including Android, Android TV, Apple TV, iOS, Fire TV, Roku and the Samsung Smart TV app.

MHz Choice Partners
In November 2016, MHz Choice launched on Amazon Prime Video Channels which gave Amazon Prime members the ability to add an MHz Choice subscription to their Amazon Prime account. In October 2018, MHz Choice launched on Comcast's Xfinity X1's over the internet on-demand service. In April 2019, MHz Choice launched on The Roku Channel as part of Roku's Premium Subscription service.

References

External links
 

Television networks in the United States
Companies based in Virginia
Companies established in 2001
2001 establishments in Virginia
Public television in the United States
Commercial-free television networks
English-language television stations in the United States
Television channels and stations established in 2001